The 1901–02 Indiana Hoosiers men's basketball team was 2nd season represented Indiana University. Their head coach was Phelps Darby, who also served as the team captain was in his 1st and only year. The team played its home games at the Old Assembly Hall in Bloomington, Indiana.

The Hoosiers finished the regular season with an overall record of 4–4.

Roster

Schedule

|-
!colspan=8| Regular Season
|-

References

Indiana
Indiana Hoosiers men's basketball seasons
Indiana Hoosiers
Indiana Hoosiers